A modular rocket is a kind of multistage rocket which has components that can interchanged for different missions. Several such rockets use similar concepts such as unified modules to minimize expenses on manufacturing, transportation and for optimization of support infrastructure for flight preparations.

The National Launch System study (1991-1992) looked at future launchers in a modular (cluster) fashion.  
This concept has existed since the creation of NASA.

Examples

Saturn C 

A government commission, the "Saturn Vehicle Evaluation Committee" (better known as the Silverstein Committee), assembled in 1959 to recommend specific directions that NASA could take with the existing Army rocket program (Jupiter, Redstone, Sergeant).  NASA's Space Exploration Program Council (1959-1963) was tasked with developing the launch architecture for the new Saturn rocket series, called Saturn C.
The Saturn C architecture consisted of five different stages (S-I, S-II, S-III, S-IV, and S-V/Centaur) that could be stacked vertically for specific rockets to meet various NASA payload and mission requirements.

This work led to development of the Saturn I, Saturn IB, and Saturn V rockets.

Atlas V 

The Atlas V expendable launch system uses the liquid fueled Common Core Booster as its first stage. In most configurations a single CCB is used with strap-on solid rocket boosters. A proposed configuration for heavier loads strapped together three CCBs for the first stage. The Common Core Booster utilizes the Russian made RD-180 burning RP-1 fuel with liquid oxygen producing a thrust of 3.8 MN. The liquid propellant tanks use an isogrid design for strength, replacing previous Atlas tank designs which were pressure stabilized.

Delta IV 

The Delta IV launcher family uses the liquid fuel Common Booster Core as the first stage of the various rocket configurations. One or three modules can be used as the first stage. In most configurations a single CBC is used with or without strap-on SRBs. Three CBCs together form the first stage of the Heavy configuration.

Angara 

The Universal Rocket Module (URM) is the modular liquid fueled first stage of the Angara expendable launch system. Depending on the configuration, the first stage can consist of 1, 3, 5 or 8 URMs. Each URM uses a Russian-made RD-191 engine burning RP-1 fuel with liquid oxygen producing a thrust of 1.92 MN.

Falcon Heavy 

The Falcon Heavy launch vehicle consists of a strengthened Falcon 9 Block 5 center core with two regular Falcon 9 Block 5 core stages with aerodynamic nosecones mounted on top of both acting as liquid-fuel strap-on boosters. Each core is powered by nine Merlin 1D engines burning rocket-grade kerosene fuel with liquid oxygen producing almost  of thrust, and all three cores together producing over 22MN of thrust. A first design of the Falcon Heavy included a unique propellant crossfeed capability, where fuel and oxidizer to power most of the engines on the center core would be fed from the two side cores, up until the side cores would be near empty and ready for the first separation event. However, due to its extreme complexity this feature was cancelled in 2015 leaving each of the three cores to burn its own fuel. Later evaluations revealed that the propellant needed for each side booster to land (reuse) are already close to the margins so there is really no advantage to crossfeed.

Like the single stick Falcon 9, each Falcon Heavy booster core is reusable. The Falcon Heavy Test Flight demonstrated the two side boosters landing simultaneously near their launch site, while the central booster attempted a landing on SpaceX's Autonomous spaceport drone ship, which resulted in a hard landing near the ship. During the second mission all three boosters landed softly. A Falcon Heavy launch that succeeds in recovering all three core boosters has the same material expenditure as the Falcon 9, i.e. the upper stage and potentially the payload fairing. As such, the difference in cost between a Falcon 9 and a Falcon Heavy launch is limited, mainly to the extra fuel and refurbishing three as opposed to one booster core.

See also
 Evolved Expendable Launch Vehicle
 Liquid Rocket Booster
 History: UR-700

External links
 EELV: The Next Stage of Space Launch
 Angara page by Khrunichev Space Center (Russian)
 Angara page on RussianSpaceWeb

References

Rocketry
Spacecraft components